René Louis Gabriel Voisin (19 November 1893 - 16 January 1952) was a French trumpeter.

Born in Angers, Voisin was a member of the Boston Symphony Orchestra trumpet section for 24 years, between 1928 and his death in 1952; he was also father and teacher to Roger Voisin, the trumpet player and pedagogue who would later become principal trumpet of the Boston Symphony.

Voisin was a student of Pierre Vignal (1879–1943) at the Conservatoire de Paris. Whilst in Paris, Voisin worked as a freelance musician, and played in the first performance of Igor Stravinsky's The Rite of Spring; here he also became friends with conductor Sergei Koussevitzky and played with the Orchestre de la Société des Concerts du Conservatoire between 1920 and 1928. Koussévitzky later succeeded Pierre Monteux as music director of the Boston Symphony Orchestra, and brought Voisin to the Boston Symphony as fourth trumpet in 1928.

1893 births
1952 deaths
French classical trumpeters
Male trumpeters
People from Angers
20th-century classical musicians
20th-century French musicians
20th-century trumpeters
20th-century French male musicians
French emigrants to the United States